The 2009–10 Dallas Mavericks season was the 30th season of the franchise in the National Basketball Association (NBA).

This is 12th season for Dirk Nowitzki. He has been selected into All Star. He was also a Team Captain. They finished another best record of 55-27 on Western 2nd seed. They got their 3rd division title for the first time since 2007.

In the playoffs, they met the San Antonio Spurs for the second straight season in a rematch of last year's first round series in which Dallas won in five games. This time, Dallas lost to the Spurs in six games.

Key dates
 June 25 – The 2009 NBA draft took place in New York City.
 July 8 – The free agency period started.

Draft picks

Roster

Pre-season

Regular season

Standings

Record vs. opponents

Game log

|- bgcolor="#ffcccc"
| 1
| October 27
| Washington
| 
| Dirk Nowitzki (34)
| Dirk Nowitzki (9)
| Jason Kidd (6)
| American Airlines Center19,871
| 0-1
|- bgcolor="#bbffbb"
| 2
| October 30
| @ LA Lakers
| 
| Dirk Nowitzki (21)
| Erick Dampier, Dirk Nowitzki (10)
| Jason Kidd (11)
| Staples Center18,997
| 1-1
|- bgcolor="#bbffbb"
| 3
| October 31
| @ LA Clippers
| 
| Dirk Nowitzki (24)
| Shawn Marion (11)
| Jason Kidd (10)
| Staples Center13,626
| 2-1

|- bgcolor="#bbffbb"
| 4
| November 3
| Utah
| 
| Dirk Nowitzki (40)
| Erick Dampier (12)
| Jason Kidd (6)
| American Airlines Center19,725
| 3-1
|- bgcolor="#ffcccc"
| 5
| November 4
| @ New Orleans
| 
| Jason Terry (35)
| Erick Dampier (14)
| Jason Kidd (10)
| New Orleans Arena13,566
| 3-2
|- bgcolor="#bbffbb"
| 6
| November 7
| Toronto
| 
| Dirk Nowitzki (29)
| Dirk Nowitzki (9)
| José Juan Barea (12)
| American Airlines Center19,977
| 4-2
|- bgcolor="#bbffbb"
| 7
| November 10
| Houston
| 
| Jason Terry (24)
| Erick Dampier(20)
| Jason Kidd (11)
| American Airlines Center19,720
| 5-2
|- bgcolor="#ffcccc"
| 8
| November 11
| @ San Antonio
| 
| Dirk Nowitzki (29)
| Dirk Nowitzki (12)
| Jason Kidd (9)
| AT&T Center18,581
| 5-3
|- bgcolor="#bbffbb"
| 9
| November 13
| @ Minnesota
| 
| Dirk Nowitzki (20)
| Dirk Nowitzki (11)
| Jason Kidd (6)
| Target Center12,372
| 6-3
|- bgcolor="#bbffbb"
| 10
| November 15
| @ Detroit
| 
| Dirk Nowitzki (25)
| Drew Gooden (11)
| Jason Kidd (7)
| Palace of Auburn Hills18,215
| 7-3
|- bgcolor="#bbffbb"
| 11
| November 16
| @ Milwaukee
| 
| Dirk Nowitzki (32)
| Drew Gooden (14)
| Jason Kidd (17)
| Bradley Center13,683
| 8-3
|- bgcolor="#bbffbb"
| 12
| November 18
| San Antonio
| 
| Dirk Nowitzki (41)
| Dirk Nowitzki (12)
| Jason Kidd (8)
| American Airlines Center20,110
| 9-3
|- bgcolor="#bbffbb"
| 13
| November 20
| Sacramento
| 
| Dirk Nowitzki, Jason Terry (20)
| Drew Gooden (16)
| Jason Kidd (11)
| American Airlines Center19,871
| 10-3
|- bgcolor="#ffcccc"
| 14
| November 24
| Golden State
| 
| Dirk Nowitzki (28)
| Drew Gooden (12)
| Jason Kidd (13)
| American Airlines20,008
| 10-4
|- bgcolor="#bbffbb"
| 15
| November 25
| @ Houston
| 
| Jason Terry (27)
| Dirk Nowitzki (8)
| Jason Terry (10)
| Toyota Center18,157
| 11-4
|- bgcolor="#bbffbb"
| 16
| November 27
| @ Indiana
| 
| Dirk Nowitzki (31)
| Kris Humphries (11)
| José Juan Barea, Jason Kidd (4)
| Conseco Fieldhouse16,631
| 12-4
|- bgcolor="#ffcccc"
| 17
| November 28
| @ Cleveland
| 
| Dirk Nowitzki (27)
| Dirk Nowitzki (9)
| Jason Kidd (9)
| Quicken Loans Arena20,562
| 12-5
|- bgcolor="#bbffbb"
| 18
| November 30
| Philadelphia
| 
| Dirk Nowitzki (28)
| Drew Gooden (10)
| Jason Kidd (11)
| American Airlines Center19,783
| 13-5

|- bgcolor="#bbffbb"
| 19
| December 2
| @ New Jersey
| 
| Dirk Nowitzki (24)
| Erick Dampier (11)
| Jason Kidd (10)
| IZOD Center11,689
| 14-5
|- bgcolor="#ffcccc"
| 20
| December 4
| @ Memphis
| 
| Jason Terry (18)
| Shawn Marion (11)
| Jason Kidd (7)
| FedExForum13,020
| 14-6
|- bgcolor="#ffcccc"
| 21
| December 5
| Atlanta
| 
| Dirk Nowitzki (32)
| Erick Dampier (12)
| Jason Kidd (6)
| American Airlines Center19,550
| 14-7
|- bgcolor="#bbffbb"
| 22
| December 8
| Phoenix
| 
| Dirk Nowitzki (33)
| Dirk Nowitzki (8)
| Jason Kidd (11)
| American Airlines Center19,857
| 15-7
|- bgcolor="#bbffbb"
| 23
| December 11
| @ Miami
| 
| Dirk Nowitzki (25)
| Erick Dampier (17)
| Jason Kidd (11)
| American Airlines Arena18,703
| 16-7
|- bgcolor="#bbffbb"
| 24
| December 12
| Charlotte
| 
| Dirk Nowitzki (36)
| Erick Dampier (18)
| Jason Kidd (9)
| American Airlines Center20,151
| 17-7
|- bgcolor="#bbffbb"
| 25
| December 14
| New Orleans
| 
| José Juan Barea (23)
| Erick Dampier, Josh Howard (8)
| Jason Kidd (13)
| American Airlines Center19,737
| 18-7
|- bgcolor="#bbffbb"
| 26
| December 16
| @ Oklahoma City
| 
| Dirk Nowitzki (35)
| Dirk Nowitzki (11)
| Jason Kidd (9)
| Ford Center18,203
| 19-7
|- bgcolor="#ffcccc"
| 27
| December 18
| Houston
| 
| José Juan Barea (23)
| Erick Dampier (14)
| Jason Kidd (10)
| American Airlines Center19,890
| 19-8
|- bgcolor="#bbffbb"
| 28
| December 20
| Cleveland
| 
| Tim Thomas (22)
| Erick Dampier (10)
| Jason Kidd (11)
| American Airlines Center20,346
| 20-8
|- bgcolor="#ffcccc"
| 29
| December 22
| Portland
| 
| Dirk Nowitzki (27)
| Erick Dampier (15)
| Jason Kidd (6)
| American Airlines Center19,863
| 20-9
|- bgcolor="#bbffbb"
| 30
| December 26
| Memphis
| 
| Jason Terry (23)
| Erick Dampier (10)
| Jason Kidd (10)
| American Airlines Center20,195
| 21-9
|- bgcolor="#bbffbb"
| 31
| December 27
| @ Denver
| 
| Drew Gooden (19)
| Dirk Nowitzki (11)
| Jason Kidd (9)
| Pepsi Center19,756
| 22-9
|- bgcolor="#ffcccc"
| 32
| December 31
| @ Houston
| 
| Jason Terry (28)
| Shawn Marion (9)
| Jason Kidd (5)
| Toyota Center18,306
| 22-10

|- bgcolor="#bbffbb"
| 33
| January 2
| @ Sacramento
| 
| Dirk Nowitzki (25)
| Drew Gooden (10)
| Jason Kidd (7)
| ARCO Center14,294
| 23-10
|- bgcolor="#ffcccc"
| 34
| January 3
| @ LA Lakers
| 
| Dirk Nowitzki (22)
| Dirk Nowitzki (8)
| Jason Kidd (5)
| Staples Center18,997
| 23-11
|- bgcolor="#bbffbb"
| 35
| January 5
| Detroit
| 
| Jason Terry (26)
| Drew Gooden (18)
| Jason Kidd (8)
| American Airlines Center19,799
| 24-11
|- bgcolor="#bbffbb"
| 36
| January 8
| @ San Antonio
| 
| Dirk Nowitzki (26)
| Drew Gooden (8)
| Jason Kidd, Jason Terry (8)
| AT&T Center18,581
| 25-11
|- bgcolor="#ffcccc"
| 37
| January 9
| Utah
| 
| Dirk Nowitzki (29)
| Erick Dampier (13)
| Jason Kidd (8)
| American Airlines Center19,922
| 25-12
|- bgcolor="#ffcccc"
| 38
| January 13
| LA Lakers
| 
| Dirk Nowitzki (30)
| Dirk Nowitzki (16)
| Jason Kidd (11)
| American Airlines Center20,461
| 25-13
|- bgcolor="#bbffbb"
| 39
| January 15
| Oklahoma City
| 
| Dirk Nowitzki (32)
| Erick Dampier (9)
| Jason Kidd (11)
| American Airlines Center20,064
| 26-13
|- bgcolor="#ffcccc"
| 40
| January 17
| @ Toronto
| 
| Dirk Nowitzki (19)
| Drew Gooden (10)
| Jason Kidd (9)
| Air Canada Centre19,004
| 26-14
|- bgcolor="#bbffbb"
| 41
| January 18
| @ Boston
| 
| Dirk Nowitzki (37)
| Shawn Marion (10)
| Jason Kidd (17)
| TD Garden18,624
| 27-14
|- bgcolor="#bbffbb"
| 42
| January 20
| @ Washington
| 
| Dirk Nowitzki (28)
| Shawn Marion (12)
| Jason Kidd (15)
| Verizon Center13,974
| 28-14
|- bgcolor="#ffcccc"
| 43
| January 22
| @ Philadelphia
| 
| Dirk Nowitzki (15)
| Jason Kidd (9)
| Jason Kidd (7)
| Wachovia Center17,647
| 28-15
|- bgcolor="#bbffbb"
| 44
| January 24
| @ NY Knicks
| 
| Dirk Nowitzki, Jason Terry (20)
| Drew Gooden (18)
| Rodrigue Beaubois (5)
| Madison Square Garden19,418
| 29-15
|- bgcolor="#bbffbb"
| 45
| January 26
| Milwaukee
| 
| Dirk Nowitzki (28)
| Erick Dampier (11)
| Jason Kidd (12)
| American Airlines Center19,799
| 30-15
|- bgcolor="#ffcccc"
| 46
| January 28
| @ Phoenix
| 
| Jason Terry (21)
| Shawn Marion (8)
| Jason Kidd (6)
| US Airways Center17,855
| 30-16
|- bgcolor="#ffcccc"
| 47
| January 30
| Portland
| 
| Dirk Nowitzki (28)
| Dirk Nowitzki (9)
| Jason Kidd (10)
| American Airlines Center20,078
| 30-17

|- bgcolor="#ffcccc"
| 48
| February 1
| @ Utah
| 
| Dirk Nowitzki (28)
| Dirk Nowitzki (8)
| Jason Kidd (9)
| EnergySolutions Arena19,911
| 30-18
|- bgcolor="#bbffbb"
| 49
| February 3
| Golden State
| 
| Jason Terry (21)
| Shawn Marion (9)
| Jason Kidd (16)
| American Airlines Center19,679
| 31-18
|- bgcolor="#ffcccc"
| 50
| February 5
| Minnesota
| 
| Dirk Nowitzki (21)
| Erick Dampier (10)
| Jason Kidd (7)
| American Airlines Center20,034
| 31-19
|- bgcolor="#bbffbb"
| 51
| February 8
| @ Golden State
| 
| Jason Terry (36)
| Drew Gooden (10)
| Jason Kidd (12)
| Oracle Arena17,015
| 32-19
|- bgcolor="#ffcccc"
| 52
| February 9
| @ Denver
| 
| Dirk Nowitzki (17)
| Drew Gooden (6)
| Jason Kidd (5)
| Pepsi Center17,485
| 32-20
|- bgcolor="#ffcccc"
| 53
| February 16
| @ Oklahoma City
| 
| Dirk Nowitzki (24)
| Erick Dampier (13)
| Dirk Nowitzki (6)
| Ford Center18,203
| 32-21
|- bgcolor="#bbffbb"
| 54
| February 17
| Phoenix
| 
| Dirk Nowitzki (28)
| Shawn Marion (10)
| Jason Kidd (10)
| American Airlines Center19,974
| 33-21
|- bgcolor="#bbffbb"
| 55
| February 19
| @ Orlando
| 
| Dirk Nowitzki (23)
| Brendan Haywood (9)
| Jason Kidd (8)
| Amway Arena17,461
| 34-21
|- bgcolor="#bbffbb"
| 56
| February 20
| Miami
| 
| Dirk Nowitzki (28)
| Brendan Haywood (11)
| Jason Kidd (11)
| American Airlines Center20,328
| 35-21
|- bgcolor="#bbffbb"
| 57
| February 22
| Indiana
| 
| Dirk Nowitzki (23)
| Brendan Haywood (20)
| Jason Kidd (7)
| American Airlines Center19,585
| 36-21
|- bgcolor="#bbffbb"
| 58
| February 24
| LA Lakers
| 
| Dirk Nowitzki (31)
| Dirk Nowitzki (9)
| Jason Kidd (13)
| American Airlines Center20,505
| 37-21
|- bgcolor="#bbffbb"
| 59
| February 26
| @ Atlanta
| 
| Dirk Nowitzki (37)
| Jason Kidd (16)
| Jason Kidd (17)
| Philips Arena18,923
| 38-21
|- bgcolor="#bbffbb"
| 60
| February 28
| New Orleans
| 
| Dirk Nowitzki (36)
| Jason Kidd (9)
| José Juan Barea (9)
| American Airlines Center19,911
| 39-21

|- bgcolor="#bbffbb"
| 61
| March 1
| @ Charlotte
| 
| Dirk Nowitzki (27)
| Dirk Nowitzki (13)
| Jason Kidd (7)
| Time Warner Cable Arena15,691
| 40-21
|- bgcolor="#bbffbb"
| 62
| March 3
| Minnesota
| 
| Jason Terry (26)
| Shawn Marion (7)
| Jason Terry (5)
| American Airlines Center19,511
| 41-21
|- bgcolor="#bbffbb"
| 63
| March 5
| Sacramento
| 
| Dirk Nowitzki (31)
| Dirk Nowitzki (12)
| Jason Kidd (12)
| American Airlines Center19,954
| 42-21
|- bgcolor="#bbffbb"
| 64
| March 6
| @ Chicago
| 
| Dirk Nowitzki (27)
| Jason Kidd (11)
| Jason Kidd (15)
| United Center21,737
| 43-21
|- bgcolor="#bbffbb"
| 65
| March 8
| @ Minnesota
| 
| Shawn Marion (29)
| Shawn Marion (14)
| Jason Kidd (9)
| Target Center14,007
| 44-21
|- bgcolor="#bbffbb"
| 66
| March 10
| New Jersey
| 
| Jason Kidd (20)
| Shawn Marion (13)
| Jason Kidd (9)
| American Airlines Center19,770
| 45-21
|- bgcolor="#ffcccc"
| 67
| March 13
| NY Knicks
| 
| Dirk Nowitzki (20)
| Dirk Nowitzki (12)
| Jason Kidd (6)
| American Airlines Center20,224
| 45-22
|- bgcolor="#bbffbb"
| 68
| March 17
| Chicago
| 
| Caron Butler (27)
| Dirk Nowitzki (7)
| Dirk Nowitzki (5)
| American Airlines Center20,406
| 46-22
|- bgcolor="#ffcccc"
| 69
| March 20
| Boston
| 
| Dirk Nowitzki (28)
| Jason Kidd (6)
| Jason Kidd (9)
| American Airlines Center20,488
| 46-23
|- bgcolor="#ffcccc"
| 70
| March 22
| @ New Orleans
| 
| Jason Terry (24)
| Brendan Haywood (9)
| Jason Kidd (6)
| New Orleans Arena14,047
| 46-24
|- bgcolor="#bbffbb"
| 71
| March 23
| LA Clippers
| 
| Jason Kidd (26)
| Brendan Haywood (10)
| Jason Kidd (12)
| American Airlines Center19,705
| 47-24
|- bgcolor="#ffcccc"
| 72
| March 25
| @ Portland
| 
| Caron Butler (25)
| Caron Butler (9)
| Jason Kidd (7)
| Rose Garden Arena20,611
| 47-25
|- bgcolor="#bbffbb"
| 73
| March 27
| @ Golden State
| 
| Rodrigue Beaubois (40)
| Dirk Nowitzki (10)
| Jason Kidd (11)
| Oracle Arena19,104
| 48-25
|- bgcolor="#bbffbb"
| 74
| March 29
| Denver
| 
| Dirk Nowitzki (34)
| Dirk Nowitzki (10)
| Jason Kidd (10)
| American Airlines Center20,085
| 49-25
|- bgcolor="#bbffbb"
| 75
| March 31
| @ Memphis
| 
| Jason Terry (29)
| Caron Butler (13)
| Jason Kidd (7)
| FedExForum11,616
| 50-25

|- bgcolor="#ffcccc"
| 76
| April 1
| Orlando
| 
| Dirk Nowitzki (24)
| Erick Dampier (11)
| Jason Kidd (2)
| American Airlines Center19,965
| 50-26
|- bgcolor="#ffcccc"
| 77
| April 3
| Oklahoma City
| 
| Dirk Nowitzki (30)
| Dirk Nowitzki (13)
| Jason Kidd (6)
| American Airlines Center20,329
| 50-27
|- bgcolor="#bbffbb"
| 78
| April 7
| Memphis
| 
| Caron Butler (23)
| Dirk Nowitzki (9)
| Jason Kidd (10)
| American Airlines Center20,105
| 51-27
|- bgcolor="#bbffbb"
| 79
| April 9
| @ Portland
| 
| Dirk Nowitzki (40)
| Jason Kidd (12)
| Jason Kidd (6)
| Rose Garden Arena20,693
| 52-27
|- bgcolor="#bbffbb"
| 80
| April 10
| @ Sacramento
| 
| Dirk Nowitzki (39)
| Jason Kidd (10)
| Jason Kidd (13)
| ARCO Arena15,247
| 53-27
|- bgcolor="#bbffbb"
| 81
| April 12
| @ LA Clippers
| 
| Dirk Nowitzki (25)
| Dirk Nowitzki (8)
| Jason Kidd (12)
| Staples Center17,838
| 54-27
|- bgcolor="#bbffbb"
| 82
| April 14
| San Antonio
| 
| Caron Butler (20)
| Brendan Haywood (15)
| Dirk Nowitzki (5)
| American Airlines Center20,405
| 55-27

Playoffs

Game log

|- bgcolor="#bbffbb"
| 1
| April 18
| San Antonio
| 
| Dirk Nowitzki (36)
| Erick Dampier (12)
| Jason Kidd (11)
| American Airlines Center20,372
| 1–0
|- bgcolor="#ffcccc"
|2
|April 21
|San Antonio
| 
| Jason Terry (27)
| Dirk Nowitzki (10)
| Jason Kidd (8)
|American Airlines Center20,728
| 1–1
|- bgcolor="#ffcccc"
|3
|April 23
|@ San Antonio
| 
| Dirk Nowitzki (35)
| Dirk Nowitzki, Jason Kidd (7)
| Jason Kidd (5)
|AT&T Center18,581
| 1–2
|- bgcolor="#ffcccc"
|4
|April 25
|@ San Antonio
| 
| Dirk Nowitzki, Caron Butler (17)
| Dirk Nowitzki (11)
| Jason Kidd (5)
|AT&T Center18,581
| 1–3
|- bgcolor="#bbffbb"
|5
|April 27
| San Antonio
| 
| Caron Butler (35)
| Caron Butler (11)
| Jason Kidd (7)
|American Airlines Center20,557
| 2–3
|- bgcolor="#ffcccc"
|6
|April 29
|@ San Antonio
| 
| Dirk Nowitzki (33)
| Jason Kidd (8)
| Jason Kidd (6)
|AT&T Center18,581
| 2–4

Player statistics

Season

|-
| 
|| 78 || 18 || 19.8 || .440 || .357 || .844 || 1.9 || 3.3 || 0.45 || 0.08 || 7.6
|-
| 
|| 56 || 16 || 12.5 || .518 || .409 || .808 || 1.4 || 1.3 || 0.52 || 0.21 || 7.1
|-
| *
|| 27 || 27 || 34.4 || .440 || .340 || .760 || 5.4 || 1.8 || 1.78 || 0.33 || 15.2
|-
| 
|| 25 || 0 || 4.8 || .360 || .211 || style=";"| 1.000 || 0.5 || 0.2 || 0.20 || 0.00 || 1.8
|-
| 
|| 55 || 47 || 23.3 || style=";"| .624 || .333 || .604 || 7.3 || 0.6 || 0.27 || 1.40 || 6.0
|-
| †
|| 46 || 11 || 22.4 || .467 || .167 || .809 || 6.9 || 0.6 || 0.57 || 1.09 || 8.9
|-
| *
|| 28 || 19 || 26.5 || .564 || .000 || .575 || 7.4 || 0.9 || 0.29 || style=";"| 2.04 || 8.1
|-
| †
|| 31 || 9 || 26.7 || .401 || .267 || .790 || 3.6 || 1.4 || 0.74 || 0.29 || 12.5
|-
| †
|| 25 || 0 || 12.6 || .461 || .000 || .568 || 3.8 || 0.3 || 0.28 || 0.44 || 5.2
|-
| 
|| 80 || style=";"| 80 || 36.0 || .423 || style=";"| .425 || .808 || 5.6 || style=";"| 9.1 || style=";"| 1.81 || 0.44 || 10.3
|-
| 
|| 75 || 75 || 31.8 || .508 || .158 || .755 || 6.4 || 1.4 || 0.92 || 0.81 || 12.0
|-
| *
|| 33 || 3 || 14.6 || .452 || .340 || .667 || 2.3 || 0.4 || 0.52 || 0.36 || 3.3
|-
| 
| style=";"| 81 || style=";"| 80 ||  style=";"| 37.5 || .481 || .421 || .915 || style=";"| 7.7 || 2.7 || 0.86 || 0.98 || style=";"| 25.0
|-
| †
|| 27 || 7 || 11.1 || .411 || .231 || .625 || 1.0 || 0.3 || 0.26 || 0.15 || 2.0
|-
| †
|| 25 || 0 || 8.4 || .375 || .227 || style=";"| 1.000 || 2.2 || 0.4 || 0.44 || 0.28 || 2.4
|-
| *
|| 24 || 5 || 11.1 || .283 || .320 || .700 || 1.1 || 0.5 || 0.21 || 0.04 || 2.0
|-
| 
|| 77 || 12 || 33.0 || .438 || .365 || .866 || 1.8 || 3.8 || 1.22 || 0.22 || 16.6
|-
|}

*Stats after being traded to the Mavericks.
†Stats before being traded from the Mavericks.

Playoffs

|-
| 
| style=";"| 6 || 0 || 17.5 || .405 || .400 || .333 || 2.0 || 2.5 || 0.33 || 0.17 || 5.8
|-
| 
|| 4 || 0 || 7.8 || .474 || .333 || .333 || 1.5 || 1.0 || 0.00 || 0.00 || 5.3
|-
| 
| style=";"| 6 || style=";"| 6 || 33.7 || .434 || .304 || .926 || 5.8 || 1.3 || 1.50 || 0.83 || 19.7
|-
| 
|| 1 || 0 || 5.0 || style=";"| 1.000 || .000 || .000 || 1.0 || 0.0 || 0.00 || 0.00 || 2.0
|-
| 
|| 5 || 4 || 23.6 || .000 || .000 || .417 || 6.6 || 0.6 || 0.20 || 1.00 || 1.5
|-
| 
| style=";"| 6 || 2 || 23.2 || .571 || .000 || .600 || 6.2 || 0.5 || 1.17 || style=";"| 1.67 || 6.0
|-
| 
| style=";"| 6 || style=";"| 6 || style=";"| 40.5 || .304 || .321 || .917 || 6.8 || style=";"| 7.0 || style=";"| 2.33 || 0.17 || 8.0
|-
| 
| style=";"| 6 || style=";"| 6 || 24.7 || .407 || .000 || .800 || 4.2 || 1.0 || 0.17 || 0.50 || 8.7
|-
| 
|| 5 || 0 || 7.2 || .250 || .000 || .000 || 1.8 || 0.0 || 0.40 || 0.00 || 0.8
|-
| 
| style=";"| 6 || style=";"| 6 || 38.8 || .547 || style=";"| .571 || style=";"| .952 || style=";"| 8.2 || 3.0 || 0.83 || 0.67 || style=";"| 26.7
|-
| 
|| 2 || 0 || 3.0 || .000 || .000 || .000 || 0.0 || 0.0 || 0.00 || 0.00 || 0.0
|-
| 
| style=";"| 6 || 0 || 29.0 || .377 || .400 || .750 || 2.5 || 2.0 || 0.67 || 0.17 || 12.7
|}

Awards, records and milestones

Awards

All-Star
 Dirk Nowitzki was voted to his 9th NBA All-Star Game and started in place of Kobe Bryant due to injury.
 Jason Kidd was selected to his 10th NBA All-Star Game as a replacement for Kobe Bryant due to injury.

Weekly/Monthly
 Dirk Nowitzki was named Western Conference Player of the Week for games played from November 9 through November 15.
 Dirk Nowitzki was named Western Conference Player of the Week for games played from February 22 through February 28.
 Dirk Nowitzki was named Western Conference Player of the Week for games played from March 1 through March 7.
 Dirk Nowitzki was named Western Conference Player of the Week for games played from April 5 through April 11.

Records
 On January 24, the Mavericks recorded their largest margin of victory in franchise history after defeating the New York Knicks 128-78, a 50-point margin. This was the third largest margin of victory in NBA history and the worst loss in Knicks history.

Milestones
 On January 13, Dirk Nowitzki became the 4th foreign-born and 1st European-born player in NBA history to score 20,000 points in his career.

Injuries
Injuries

Transactions

Trades

Free agents
On Tuesday, July 28 Dallas signed free agent forward Tim Thomas

On Thursday July 30 Dallas signed forward Drew Gooden.

Additions

Subtractions
9-15-09: Released, Greg Buckner (G)

10-23-09: Waived, Jake Voskuhl (C)

References

External links
 2009–10 Dallas Mavericks season at ESPN
 2009–10 Dallas Mavericks season at Basketball Reference

Dallas Mavericks seasons
Dallas
Dallas
Dallas